The Celebration Belle is a riverboat on the Mississippi River.  This boat normally serves the Quad Cities region as a passenger excursion boat.  Originally, the boat was named the Mississippi Belle and was based in Dubuque, Iowa.

In 2004 the Celebration Belle participated in the Grand Excursion.

References

Steamboats of the Mississippi River